Toxorhynchites speciosus is a mosquito species in the genus Toxorhynchites found in  Australia.

Toxorhynchites larvae, a mosquito genus that does not suck blood, feed upon other mosquito larvae and are often found with tiger mosquito  (Aedes albopictus) larvae. Together with Mesocyclops aspericornis, T. speciosus forms a compatible predator pair for reduction of larval Aedes notoscriptus and Culex quinquefasciatus populations in tire habitats in Queensland.

References

External links 
 
 

speciosus
Insects of Australia
Insects used as insect pest control agents
Diptera used as pest control agents
Insects described in 1889